Yiram of Magdiel (fl. tenth century) was a minor Italian Jewish commentator on the Bible, active in Rome. The term Magdiel, which appears in Genesis 36:43, was apparently interpreted as Rome (see Rashi on that verse), so that his name was really Yiram of Rome.

Yiram was a younger contemporary of Saadia Gaon and perhaps even his student. He apparently wrote a commentary on the Books of Chronicles, which is only known from a handful of fragments. These were later compiled into a single document, together with the works of other commentators such as Judah ibn Kuraish. The document was edited and published in Frankfurt-am-Main, Germany, in 1874 under the title Ein Kommentar zur Chronik aus dem 10. Jahrhundert. From this text it seems that the original compiler of the work was critical of Yiram's interpretation of the subject matter, and said that he did not fully understand the meaning of the passages on which he commented.

References

External links
A commentary on Chronicles, containing fragments of Yiram's work (Frankfurt 1874)

10th-century Italian rabbis
Writers from Rome
Bible commentators
Year of death unknown
Year of birth unknown
Rabbis from Rome